The 1895–96 international cricket season was from September 1895 to April 1896.

Season overview

February

England in South Africa

References

International cricket competitions by season
1895 in cricket
1896 in cricket